A monk is a person who practices a strict religious and ascetic lifestyle.

Monk may also refer to:

People
 Monk (nickname)
 Monk (surname)
 Monk Gibbon (1896–1987), Irish poet and author
 Monk Higgins (1936–1986), American musician and saxophonist
 Thelonious Monk (1917-1982), American jazz pianist and composer

Places
 Monk (Montreal Metro), a metro station in Montreal, Québec, Canada
 Monk Islands, South Orkney Islands, off Antarctica
 Monk's House, an 18th-century English cottage

Arts and entertainment

Characters
 Monk (character class), a character class in a number of role-playing tabletop and video games
 Monk (Dungeons & Dragons), a playable character in most versions of Dungeons & Dragons
 Monk (comics), a vampire-werewolf hybrid and nemesis of Batman
 The Monk (Doctor Who), a recurring villain in the Doctor Who television series and related media
 Andrew Blodgett Mayfair ("Monk"), an adventurer associate of Doc Savage's
 the title character of Monk Little Dog, an animated series for children on CITV
 Adrian Monk, the protagonist of the television series Monk
 William Monk, a Victorian-era detective

Films
 The Monk (1969 film), a made-for-television movie
 The Monk (1972 film), a French-German-Italian-Belgian film
 The Monk (1975 film), a Hong Kong martial arts film
 The Monk (1990 film), a British film
 The Monk (2011 film), a French film
 The Monk (2015 film), a Chinese film

Music
 Monk (band), led by former Over the Rhine guitarist Ric Hordinski
 Monk (1954 album), by Thelonious Monk
 Monk (1964 album), by Thelonious Monk

Television
 Monk (TV series), a television show about an obsessive-compulsive detective
 Monk (soundtrack), a 2004 soundtrack of the show

In print
 Monk Magazine, a magazine featuring the adventures of Jim Crotty and Michael Lane
 The Monk, a 1796 Gothic novel by Matthew Gregory Lewis

Flora and fauna
 Amauris tartarea, a butterfly also known as the monk or dusky friar
 Monk parakeet (Myiopsitta monachus), a bird of South America
 Monk seal, any of several species of the tribe Monachini
 Siraitia grosvenorii, a vine which bears a fruit known as monk fruit

Other uses
 Monk shoe, a men's shoe with a buckled strap

See also
 Monck (disambiguation)
 Monks (disambiguation)
 SS Major General Wilhelm Mohnke (1911–2001), one of the original 120 members of the Nazi SS-Staff Guard "Berlin"